William Townsend Tapley (February 10, 1913 – January 6, 1993) was an American baseball shortstop in the Negro leagues. The brother of fellow Negro leaguer John Tapley, he played with the Akron Grays in 1933.

References

External links
 and Seamheads

Akron Black Tyrites players
1913 births
1993 deaths
Baseball players from Missouri
Baseball shortstops
20th-century African-American sportspeople